The Chuska Valley is a geographical region located in the northwestern portion of the U.S. state of New Mexico. Sitting atop the Colorado Plateau in the Four Corners region of the desert Southwest, it is near both Chacra Mesa and Chaco Canyon, which are noted for their Chacoan Anasazi ruins. The Chaco Slope is differentiated from the neighboring Gobernador Slope, Chaco Core, and Chaco Plateau by distinct surface water drainage patterns and geological formations. These regions were first labelled by archaeologist Gwinn Vivian. The valley is associated with the nearby Chuska Mountains.

Citations

References 
 .

Colorado Plateau
Valleys of New Mexico
Landforms of San Juan County, New Mexico